Reinet Investments S.C.A. is a Luxembourg-based investment vehicle that was demerged from the Swiss luxury goods company Richemont on 20 October 2008. It is listed on the Luxembourg Stock Exchange (LuxSE), and at 2020 is the third-largest component of the LuxX Index.

History
Upon formation, Reinet controlled €350m in cash, €50m in miscellaneous investments, and a 4% stake (84.3 million shares) in British American Tobacco (BAT).  On the first day of Reinet trading, BAT's share price opened at £17.31, valuing Reinet's stake at £1.46bn (€1.88bn). The formation of Reinet allowed the Rupert family to spin off all non-luxuries related activities, and allow Richemont to focus purely on its core investments.

In January 2009, Reinet entered into negotiations to purchase the private equity business of Lehman Brothers, which is now known as Trilantic Capital Partners.

Investment Strategy
Reinet states that its investment strategy is to take a long-term view of investment opportunities, to invest in a wide range of asset classes (including listed and unlisted equities, bonds, real estate and derivative instruments), while emphasis will at all times be on the protection of shareholders' capital.

The company does not publicise a list of its investments other than in BAT.

See also
Lehman Brothers Merchant Banking

References

External links
Reinet Investments official website

Companies listed on the Luxembourg Stock Exchange
Companies listed on the Johannesburg Stock Exchange
Investment companies of Luxembourg
Financial services companies established in 2008
Companies based in Luxembourg City
Holding companies of Luxembourg
Private equity firms of Europe